Jesse Stone  (born March 21, 1956) is an American politician from the state of Georgia. A member of the Republican Party, Stone represented the 23rd district in the Georgia State Senate from 2011 to 2021. He is a former mayor of Waynesboro, Georgia.

References

1956 births
Living people
Republican Party Georgia (U.S. state) state senators
21st-century American politicians